Ludwik Abramowicz-Niepokójczycki (5 July 1879 – 3 March 1939) was a Polish activist, bibliophile, publicist and editor. He was one of the major activists of the krajowcy faction, living in Vilnius (Vilna in Russian).

Life
Born in Moscow, he studied in Kharkiv and Kraków. In 1906 he moved to Vilnius.

During World War I, while living in Poland, he actively supported Lithuanian independence. There he was active contributor to Gazeta Wileńska, founded by Michał Römer. Later he was an editor of Polish language newspaper Przegląd Wileński (Wilno Review, 1912–1913, 1921–1939). The newspaper promoted krajowcy views and developed Lithuanian cultural ideas separate from Polish culture. After Abramowicz returned to Vilnius in 1919, he actively promoted the idea, that Vilnius Region should be transferred to Lithuania without tying Lithuania to union with Poland, although he suggested a cultural autonomy for Poles. The issues of the Przegląd Wileński newspaper were confiscated many times by local authorities.

Abramowicz held active correspondence with Lithuanian Jonas Šliūpas and other Lithuanian activists. Abramowicz delivered a speech at Jonas Basanavičius' funeral.

References

Sources
  Maria Nekanda-Trepka, Ludwik Abramowicz-Niepokójczycki - redaktor "Przeglądu Wileńskiego", Nasz Czas 19/2005 (668)

1879 births
1939 deaths
People from Vilnius
People from the Russian Empire of Polish descent
Krajowcy
Jagiellonian University alumni